The Aggenstein is a mountain, 1,986 metres high (according to German survey) in the Allgäu Alps on the border Bavaria, Germany and Tyrol, Austria. It is located in the Bavarian part of the Tannheim Mountains, a few kilometres south of Pfronten (Ostallgäu).

Location and surrounding area 
The prominence of the Aggenstein is at least 266 metres, its isolation is 1.8 kilometres, the  Brentenjoch being the reference peak.

Routes to the summit 
 Via Pfronten – Breitenberg – Böser Tritt – Bad Kissinger Hut (Alpine Club hut) – summit (ca. 2.5 hours)
 Via Pfronten Breitenberg – Böser Tritt – Langer Strich – summit (ca. 2 hours); cable car available
 Via Pfronten – Reichenbach-Klamm – Bad Kissinger Hut (Alpine Club hut) – summit (ca. 3.5 hours)
 Via Grän/Enge (Austria) – Bad Kissinger Hut – summit (ca. 2.5 hours)
 Via Grän – Füssener Jöchle – Tannheimer Höhenweg – Bad Kissinger Hut – summit (ca. 2.5 hours); cable car available

External links

References 

Mountains of Bavaria
Mountains of Tyrol (state)
Allgäu Alps
Mountains of the Alps